Acinetobacter guillouiae is a gram-negative, strictly aerobic bacterium from the genus Acinetobacter isolated from gasworks effluent.

References

External links
Type strain of Acinetobacter guillouiae at BacDive -  the Bacterial Diversity Metadatabase

Moraxellaceae
Bacteria described in 2010